Un Día Normal (English: A Normal Day) is the second studio album recorded by Colombian singer-songwriter Juanes, It was released by Surco Records on 21 May 2002. The album was remastered in 2022 for its 20th anniversary.

Album information

The album was highly successful in Latin America. It was certified gold in Colombia during its first day of sales and was certified platinum and multi-platinum in countries including Colombia, United States, Spain and Mexico. The album spent 92 weeks in the top ten of Billboards Top Latin Albums chart, setting a new record and spent a total of two years on the chart.'''''

The album also features "Fotografía" ("Photograph"), a duet with the Canadian pop singer Nelly Furtado about the isolation between lovers. All songs on the album were self-written by Juanes, except for the last song, "La Noche" ("The Night"), which was written by Joe Arroyo.

The album won six Latin Grammy Awards, one in 2002 for Best Rock Song ("A Dios le Pido") and five in 2003 for Album of the Year, Best Rock Solo Album, Song of the Year ("Es Por Tí"), Record of the Year ("Es Por Ti") and Best Rock Song ("Mala Gente").

Track listing

Videoclips
 A Dios le Pido
 Es por Tí
 La Paga
 Fotografía
 Mala Gente

Charts

Weekly charts

Certifications

Singles

Charts

See also
2002 in Latin music
List of best-selling Latin albums in the United States
 List of best-selling Latin albums

References

2002 albums
Juanes albums
Latin Grammy Award winners for Album of the Year
Universal Music Latino albums
Spanish-language albums
Latin Grammy Award for Best Rock Solo Vocal Album
Albums produced by Gustavo Santaolalla